Rasawa is a Papuan language of Indonesia. It is spoken in Rasawa village in Oudate District, Waropen Regency.

Rasawa shares half of its basic vocabulary with the Saponi language.

References

Languages of western New Guinea
Wapoga languages